Mount Littlepage is a mountain in the Head Mountains, over  high, standing between Mount DeWitt and Mount Dearborn, just west of the north end of the Willett Range, in Victoria Land, Antarctica. It was named by the Advisory Committee on Antarctic Names for Jack L. Littlepage, a biologist at McMurdo Station in 1961, who worked additional summer seasons there, 1959–60 and 1961–62.

Features
Pedalling Ice Field

References

Mountains of Victoria Land
Scott Coast